Tauranga Central is a suburb and the central business district of Tauranga, in the Bay of Plenty Region of New Zealand's North Island.

Demographics

Tauranga Central had a population of 2,625 at the 2018 New Zealand census, an increase of 303 people (13.0%) since the 2013 census, and an increase of 336 people (14.7%) since the 2006 census. There were 1,092 households, comprising 1,266 males and 1,362 females, giving a sex ratio of 0.93 males per female. The median age was 52.1 years (compared with 37.4 years nationally), with 243 people (9.3%) aged under 15 years, 468 (17.8%) aged 15 to 29, 1,083 (41.3%) aged 30 to 64, and 828 (31.5%) aged 65 or older.

Ethnicities were 77.4% European/Pākehā, 10.6% Māori, 2.4% Pacific peoples, 15.0% Asian, and 2.4% other ethnicities. People may identify with more than one ethnicity.

The percentage of people born overseas was 31.5, compared with 27.1% nationally.

Although some people chose not to answer the census's question about religious affiliation, 40.7% had no religion, 43.7% were Christian, 0.8% had Māori religious beliefs, 2.4% were Hindu, 1.3% were Muslim, 1.4% were Buddhist and 3.7% had other religions.

Of those at least 15 years old, 507 (21.3%) people had a bachelor's or higher degree, and 381 (16.0%) people had no formal qualifications. The median income was $29,300, compared with $31,800 nationally. 339 people (14.2%) earned over $70,000 compared to 17.2% nationally. The employment status of those at least 15 was that 1,017 (42.7%) people were employed full-time, 327 (13.7%) were part-time, and 66 (2.8%) were unemployed.

Economy

Bay Central Shopping Centre is located in Tauranga Central. It consists of 30 stores, including Briscoes and Rebel Sport.

Notable buildings

The Elms Mission House, 15 Mission St, 1835, oldest surviving building in the Bay of Plenty.
Tauranga Bond Store, 1 The Strand, 1883, warehouse and bond store.
War Memorial Gates, 45 Cameron Road, 1921, First world war memorial.
Old Post Office, 41 Harington St, 1900s, Post Office and Government Building.
Hotel St Amand, 105 The Strand, 1918, Hotel built to accommodate people arriving by ship.
Brain-Watkins House, 233 Cameron Road, 1883, Private residence.
Native School and Hostel, 83 Seventh Avenue, 1878, Early school, now a private residence.
Taiparoro, 11 Fifth Avenue, 1882, Guesthouse.
House and Shop, 105 Cameron Road, 1897, Two buildings, separately relocated.
Hotel on Devonport, 72 Devonport Road, 2004, Tauranga's tallest building at 16 floors high.

Education

References

Suburbs of Tauranga
Central business districts in New Zealand
Populated places around the Tauranga Harbour